The Plum Group, Inc. (DBA Plum Voice) is a company.

Plum is headquartered in New York City with offices in Boston and Denver.

History
Plum Voice, founded in 2000 as The Plum Group, Inc., was incorporated to
create technologies for personalized audio communication.  By 2001, Plum had
commercialized the open-standard Plum VoiceXML IVR platform which
facilitated the creation of dynamic telecom applications. 
 
2001 - Commercial launch of Plum VoiceXML IVR platform for customer-premises deployment
2002 - Launch of Plum Voice Hosting Centers for 24x7x365 managed IVR hosting
2004 - Plum Voice application suite receives a "Product of the Year" award from Customer Interactions magazine
2008 - Plum Survey builder launched, a do-it-yourself IVR survey tool.  
2010 - Plum launched QuickFuse, a web-based rapid development platform used to create voice applications.
2013 - Plum launched VoiceTrends, an analytics and reporting toolkit designed specifically for voice applications. Plum achieves PCI-DSS Level 1.
2015 - Plum launched Plum Insight, a multi-channel (voice, web, mobile) survey platform. Plum achieves HIPAA compliance.
2016 - Plum launched a new version of QuickFuse called Fuse+.
2020 - Plum sunsets QuickFuse, rebrands Fuse+ as Plum Fuse.

See also
IVR
PaaS
SaaS
Speech recognition
Voice
VoiceXML

References

 Create Voice Apps From a Point-and-Click Interface with QuickFuse ReadWriteWeb
Updating IVR to Optimize Business Success: An Interview with Plum's President Matt Ervin TMC Magazine
Plum Voice Partners with Tyler Technologies to Provide its VoiceXML IVR Platform Speech Technology Magazine
 Plum Platform Awarded VoiceXML 2.0 Certification by VoiceXML Forum  Speech Technology Magazine
PlumVoice goes for low-hanging fruit in IVR market Boston Business Journal
Plum Global Voice Offers VoiceXML Developer Accounts In United Kingdom  Contact Center World
Plum Voice Company profile Business Week
The Magic IVR  Non-Profit Tech Blog
Artist in Residence Use Plum Technology  Boston Cyberarts
Meeting the changing needs of call centres Callcentre Helper Magazine
Plum Voice cited as established Telephony provider TechCrunch
Plum Voice Announces Immediate Availability of QuickFuse, an Intuitive Cloud Telephony Service to Create Smarter Voice Applications   Denver Business Journal
Plum Voice Unveils New Pollster Version of Plum Survey Platform Forbes

Telephony
Speech recognition